Ocalea  may refer to:

Ocalea (mythology)
Ocalea (genus), a genus of insect of the order Coleoptera
Ocalea (river)
Ocalea (town)